The Ramarama languages of Rondônia, Brazil form a branch of the Tupian language family. They are Karo, or Ramarama, with 150 speakers, and the extinct Urumi.

Varieties
Below is a list of Itogapúc (Ramarama) language varieties listed by Loukotka (1968), including names of unattested varieties.

Itogapúc / Ntogapyd - once spoken on the Machadinho River, Mato Grosso, now perhaps extinct.
Ramarama / Ytangá - spoken at the sources of the Machadinho River, Branco River, and Preto River, Mato Grosso.
Urumí - spoken on the Taruma River in Mato Grosso.
Urukú - spoken on the Lourdes River.
Arara - spoken at the mouth of the Preto River and Ji-Paraná River, and to the Madeira River.

References

Tupian languages